Bodha is a 2018 Indian Tamil-language crime comedy film directed by debutant Suresh and starring newcomer Vicky. The film was dubbed in Telugu as Call Boy.

Cast 
Vicky as Madhan 
Mippu as Karthik
Vinodh Munna as an inspector
Eswar as an agent
Rahul Thatha as a hipster
Shanmugasundaram as the father-in-law 
Risha in a special appearance in the song "We Love You Money"

Soundtrack
Soundtrack was composed by Siddharth Vipin.
Ambala Item - Guru, Siddharth Vipin	
We Love You Money - Jagadeesh, Siddharth Vipin

Release 
The Times of India gave the film a rating of two out of five stars and wrote that "The comic bits are hardly funny while the thriller elements are barely there". Deccan Chronicle gave the film the same rating and wrote that "Though the script had all the potential to make it an interesting movie, a lacklustre writing and incoherent screenplay turns Bodha an ordinary fare". The New Indian Express stated that "Bodha is a film about money and what people do for it. It's too bad the film isn't good enough to justify the money you part with to see it". Vikatan criticized the screenplay, the cinematography, and the background music.

References

External links 

2010s crime comedy films
Films scored by Siddharth Vipin
Indian crime comedy films
2010s Tamil-language films